Yelena Sipatova (born 7 June 1955) is a retired long-distance runner from the Soviet Union, and a former winner of the Rome City Marathon (1995) and the Istanbul Marathon (1993).

Career 
She was the first IAAF-recognised women's world record holder in the 10,000 metres with her time of 32:17.20 minutes. She also set an unrecognised world best in the 5000 metres, with 15:24.6 minutes in 1981.

Her first successes came under her maiden name, Yelena Chernysheva (also transliterated Elena Chernyshova), and she was the individual bronze medallist and team gold medallist at the 1980 IAAF World Cross Country Championships. She repeated that same feat at the 1981 event and won a third and final team title at the 1982 edition (leading the Soviet women in seventh).

On the track she competed in the 3000 metres. She won a silver outdoors at the 1981 European Cup, then won a bronze medal at the 1982 European Athletics Championships. She was a gold medallist at the 1983 European Athletics Indoor Championships.

International competitions

Circuit wins 
Rome City Marathon: 1995 (2:32:57)
Lille Marathon 1995 (2:36:21)

References 

1955 births
Living people
Place of birth missing (living people)
Russian female long-distance runners
Soviet female long-distance runners
Russian female marathon runners
Soviet female marathon runners
World record setters in athletics (track and field)
European Athletics Championships medalists